A list of Imperial Army-Navy personnel with responsibility for military teaching and training of new recruits.

Commandants and Directors in Army War College
Sadao Araki:- Commandant, War College,
Yaezo Akashiba:- Director War College
Shuichi Miyazaki:- Deputy Commandant, War College
Toshiro Obata:- Deputy Commandant, War College
Jo Iimura:- Deputy Commandant in War College
Tsunenori Kaya:- Commandant in War College

Commandments and Directors in the Imperial Japanese Army Academy
Hideki Tōjō:- Commandant, Military Academy
Kenzo Kitano:- Commandant, Military Academy
Renya Mutaguchi:- Commandant, Military Academy
Akira Mutō:- assigned Direction in Military Academy

Commander of the Naval War College
Chuichi Nagumo:- Commander of Naval War CollegePresident and Commander of the Naval War CollegeNobutake Kondō:- President of the Japanese Naval War College
Sokichi Takagi:- Commander of the Japanese Naval War CollegeCommandants and Directors in Army and Navy academies and schoolYoshikazu Nishi:- Commandant of the Field Artillery School
Masatake Yasuoka:- Commandant of the Army Tank School
Hitoshi Imamura:- Commandant, Narashino Army School
Jirō Minami:- direction of Cavalry School
Kyoji Tominaga:- Commandant, Kungchuling Army Tank School (Manchuria)
Michio Sugawara:- Commandant, Shimoshizu Army Air School, Commandant, Military Air Academy, Air Training Army Commander
Rikichi Tsukada:- Commanding General, Airborne Operations Training Unit
Jisaburo Ozawa:- President of the Japanese Naval Academy
Shigetarō Shimada:- Commandant, Imperial Navy Submarine School
Kumaichi Teramoto:- Director, Hamamatsu Army Air School
Heisuke Yanagawa:- Commandant of the Army Cavalry School
Yoshitoshi Tokugawa:- Commandant of Akeno Army Aviation School and Tokorozawa Army Aviation SchoolMilitary SuperintendentsRikichi Andō:- Superintendent, Toyama Army School
Harukichi Hyakutake:- attached/Superintendent to Army Signal School, Superintendent, Hiroshima Military Prep School
Korechika Anami:- Superintendent, Tokyo Military Preparatory School
Mitsuo Nakazawa:- Superintendent, Military Preparatory Academy
Tasuku Okada:- Superintendent, Army Tank School
Ichiro Shichida:- Superintendent, Army School of Science, Superintendent, Toyama Army School
Sizuichi Tanaka:- Superintendent, War College
Kumaichi Teramoto:- Superintendent, Hamamatsu Army Air School
Toshimichi Uemura:- Superintendent, Tokyo Army Preparatory School
Otozō Yamada:- Superintendent, Military AcademyMilitary professors and instructorsHeisuke Yanagawa:- Instructor at the War College
Tsunenori Kaya:- Instructor at the War College
Yasuhiko Asaka:- Instructor at the Military Academy
Un Yi:- Instructor at Military Staff College
Haruhito Kanin:- Instructor Attached to Chiba Army Tank School and War College
Kenzo Kitano:- Commanding Officer, Senior-Course Cadet Unit
Keisuke Fujie:- Instructor (Military Academy) also Director, Field Artillery School, Superintendent, War College
Okikatsu Arao:- Instructor, Infantry School
Masaharu Homma:- Instructor, War College
Shōjirō Iida:- Instructor, Infantry School
Tomitaro Horii:- attached to 3rd Infantry Regiment-Training Officer, Waseda University
Kanji Ishiwara:- Instructor, War College
Tadasu Kataoka:- Instructor, Army Cavalry School
Masakazu Kawabe:- Commanding Officer, Training Regiment, infantry School
Torashirō Kawabe:- Instructor (Tactics), War College, Hamamatsu Army Flying School
Kiyotake Kawaguchi:- Instructor, Army Heavy Artillery School
Heitarō Kimura:- Instructor, War College, Artillery Department, Office of Military Training
Seiichi Kita:- Instructor, War College
Koiso Kuniaki:- Instructor, Military Academy
Shiro Makino:- Instructor, Military Academy also Senior Instructor/Superintendent, Military Preparatory Academy
Jinsaburo Mazaki:- Instructor, Training Unit Military Academy
Shuichi Miyazaki:- Instructor Cadet Unit, Military Academy Preparatory School, Military Instructor, War College, Deputy Commandant, War College
Takeshi Mori:- Instructor, Cavalry School; Instructor, War College
Toshizō Nishio:- Instructor, War College, Section Chief, Office of Military Training
Fukutaro Nishiyama:- Instructor, Military Academy
Tetsuzan Nagata:- Office of Military Training
Masutaro Nakai:- Instructor, Military Academy (tactics)
Mitsuo Nakazawa:- Instructor, War College, Superintendent, Military Preparatory Academy
Kanji Nishihara:- concurrently Instructor, War College
Kengo Noda:- Instructor, Infantry School, Commanding Officer, Training Unit, Infantry School
Shihei Oba:- Commanding Officer, Infantry Unit, Toyohashi Reserve Officer School
Hideyoshi Obata:- Instructor, War College, Commandant, Akeno Army Air School
Sanji Okido:- Instructor, War College, November
Ichiro Shichida:- Instructor, Infantry School, Superintendent, Military Preparatory Academy, Director, Military Academy, Superintendent, Army School of Science, Superintendent, Toyama Army School
Takuma Shimoyama:- Instructor, Military Academy, Office of Military Training, Instructor, War College
Hisakazu Tanaka:- Instructor, War College
Rikichi Tsukada:- Attached, Training Unit, Shimoshizu Army Air School, Instructor, Hamamatsu Army Air School and Commanding General, Airborne Operations Training Unit
Jun Ushiroku:- attached to Training Unit, Military Academy
Otozō Yamada:- Instructor, War College, Instructor, Cavalry School Chief, Army Signal School, Superintendent, Military Academy
Takeo Yasuda:- Instructor, Artillery and Engineering School, Member, Research Branch, Army Signal School, LtCol, May Member, Research Branch, Army Signal School
Hitoshi Asano:- Instructor, Akeno and Narashino Air base
Ichiki Kioyonao:- Instructor, Army Infantry School
Sokichi Takagi:- instructor of the Naval Staff college
Shigetarō Shimada:- Instructor, Naval War College, Commandant, Imperial Navy Submarine School
Nobuo Fujita:- Instructor Japanese Navy Air force
Saburō Sakai:- Instructor, Ohmura Navy Airbase
Hiroyoshi Nishizawa:- Instructor, Yokosuka Navy Airfield
Tetsuzō Iwamoto:- Instructor, Yokosuka and Tokushima Navy AirfieldTechnicians, researchers and experts in military sciences'''
Takushiro Hattori:- General Staff Headquarters-Army Tank School, Research Section, Army Engineer School, Research Section
Ichiki Kioyonao:- Member, Research Branch, Toyama Army School, Instructor, Army Infantry School
Jo Iimura:- Instructor and Deputy Commandant in War College, Member, Research Staff, War College; Chief, Total Warfare Research Institute, he made extensive trips throughout East Asia, to collect instructional materials and operative practices.
Kanji Nishihara:- Director, Research Department, Infantry School Deputy Commandant, Narashino Army School, concurrently Instructor, War College
Teiichi Suzuki:- Member, Research Division, War College
Takeo Yasuda:- Member, Research Branch, Army Signal School
Michio Sugawara:- Major (Air Force); Section Chief, Army Aeronautical Department
Kumaichi Teramoto:- LtCol (Air Force), Officer attached; later Member in Army Aeronautical Department
Takeo Yasuda:- Officer attached to Army Air Technical Laboratories (MajGen)
Yoshitoshi Tokugawa:- Director of the Research Department and Director of Technical Training Department, Tokorozawa Army Aviation School

See also
Rikugun Shikan Gakko

Military instructors and trainers, Empire of Japan
Military instructors and trainers, Empire of Japan
Military instructors and trainers, Empire of Japan
Military instructors and trainers